Anantharam is a village and panchayat in Ranga Reddy district, Telangana, India. It falls under Chevella mandal. The famous temple Panchalingala located on the outskirts of the village hills/gutta. The village produced scholars and well known per well educated people.

References

Villages in Ranga Reddy district